The John Stickel House is a historic house built of lava rock located in Jerome, Idaho, United States.

Description
Built of lava rock with random rubble masonry this one story historic home has a shallow gabled roof. Unpainted shipboard covers the gables above the stonework laid by Ed Bennet. It represents an unaltered work of vernacular architecture by Bennet built from rock that was from the property of the farmer John Stickel. Stickel was born in South Dakota and died in 1961.

History
The house was built in 1931 by mason Ed Bennet. It was listed on the National Register of Historic Places on September 8, 1983.

See also
 Historic preservation
 National Register of Historic Places listings in Jerome County, Idaho

References

External links
 

Houses completed in 1931
Houses in Jerome County, Idaho
Houses on the National Register of Historic Places in Idaho
National Register of Historic Places in Jerome County, Idaho